A breeder reactor is a nuclear reactor that generates more fissile material than it consumes. Breeder reactors achieve this because their neutron economy is high enough to create more fissile fuel than they use, by irradiation of a fertile material, such as uranium-238 or thorium-232, that is loaded into the reactor along with fissile fuel. Breeders were at first found attractive because they made more complete use of uranium fuel than light water reactors, but interest declined after the 1960s as more uranium reserves were found, and new methods of uranium enrichment reduced fuel costs.

Fuel efficiency and types of nuclear waste 

Breeder reactors could, in principle, extract almost all of the energy contained in uranium or thorium, decreasing fuel requirements by a factor of 100 compared to widely used once-through light water reactors, which extract less than 1% of the energy in the uranium mined from the earth. The high fuel-efficiency of breeder reactors could greatly reduce concerns about fuel supply, energy used in mining, and storage of radioactive waste. With seawater uranium extraction (currently too expensive to be economical), there is enough fuel for breeder reactors to satisfy our energy needs for 5 billion years at 1983's total energy consumption rate, thus making nuclear energy effectively a renewable energy.

Nuclear waste became a greater concern by the 1990s. In broad terms, spent nuclear fuel has two main components. The first consists of fission products, the leftover fragments of fuel atoms after they have been split to release energy. Fission products come in dozens of elements and hundreds of isotopes, all of them lighter than uranium. The second main component of spent fuel is transuranics (atoms heavier than uranium), which are generated from uranium or heavier atoms in the fuel when they absorb neutrons but do not undergo fission. All transuranic isotopes fall within the actinide series on the periodic table, and so they are frequently referred to as the actinides.

The physical behavior of the fission products is markedly different from that of the transuranics. In particular, fission products do not themselves undergo fission, and therefore cannot be used for nuclear weapons. Furthermore, only seven long-lived fission product isotopes have half-lives longer than a hundred years, which makes their geological storage or disposal less problematic than for transuranic materials.

With increased concerns about nuclear waste, breeding fuel cycles came under renewed interest as they can reduce actinide wastes, particularly plutonium and minor actinides. Breeder reactors are designed to fission the actinide wastes as fuel, and thus convert them to more fission products.

After spent nuclear fuel is removed from a light water reactor, it undergoes a complex decay profile as each nuclide decays at a different rate. Due to a physical oddity referenced above, there is a large gap in the decay half-lives of fission products compared to transuranic isotopes. If the transuranics are left in the spent fuel, after 1,000 to 100,000 years, the slow decay of these transuranics would generate most of the radioactivity in that spent fuel. Thus, removing the transuranics from the waste eliminates much of the long-term radioactivity of spent nuclear fuel.

Today's commercial light water reactors do breed some new fissile material, mostly in the form of plutonium. Because commercial reactors were never designed as breeders, they do not convert enough uranium-238 into plutonium to replace the uranium-235 consumed. Nonetheless, at least one-third of the power produced by commercial nuclear reactors comes from fission of plutonium generated within the fuel. Even with this level of plutonium consumption, light water reactors consume only part of the plutonium and minor actinides they produce, and nonfissile isotopes of plutonium build up, along with significant quantities of other minor actinides.

Conversion ratio, break-even, breeding ratio, doubling time, and burnup 

One measure of a reactor's performance is the "conversion ratio," defined as the ratio of new fissile atoms produced to fissile atoms consumed. All proposed nuclear reactors except specially designed and operated actinide burners experience some degree of conversion. As long as there is any amount of a fertile material within the neutron flux of the reactor, some new fissile material is always created.  When the conversion ratio is greater than 1, it is often called the "breeding ratio."

For example, commonly used light water reactors have a conversion ratio of approximately 0.6. Pressurized heavy water reactors (PHWR) running on natural uranium have a conversion ratio of 0.8. In a breeder reactor, the conversion ratio is higher than 1. "Break-even" is achieved when the conversion ratio reaches 1.0 and the reactor produces as much fissile material as it uses.

The doubling time is the amount of time it would take for a breeder reactor to produce enough new fissile material to replace the original fuel and additionally produce an equivalent amount of fuel for another nuclear reactor. This was considered an important measure of breeder performance in early years, when uranium was thought to be scarce. However, since uranium is more abundant than thought in the early days of nuclear reactor development, and given the amount of plutonium available in spent reactor fuel, doubling time has become a less-important metric in modern breeder-reactor design.

"Burnup" is a measure of how much energy has been extracted from a given mass of heavy metal in fuel, often expressed (for power reactors) in terms of gigawatt-days per ton of heavy metal. Burnup is an important factor in determining the types and abundances of isotopes produced by a fission reactor. Breeder reactors, by design, have extremely high burnup compared to a conventional reactor, as breeder reactors produce much more of their waste in the form of fission products, while most or all of the actinides are meant to be fissioned and destroyed.

In the past, breeder-reactor development focused on reactors with low breeding ratios, from 1.01 for the Shippingport Reactor running on thorium fuel and cooled by conventional light water to over 1.2 for the Soviet BN-350 liquid-metal-cooled reactor. Theoretical models of breeders with liquid sodium coolant flowing through tubes inside fuel elements ("tube-in-shell" construction) suggest breeding ratios of at least 1.8 are possible on an industrial scale. The Soviet BR-1 test reactor achieved a breeding ratio of 2.5 under non-commercial conditions.

Types of breeder reactor 

Many types of breeder reactor are possible:

A 'breeder' is simply a reactor designed for very high neutron economy with an associated conversion rate higher than 1.0. In principle, almost any reactor design could be tweaked to become a breeder. For example, the Light Water Reactor, a very heavily moderated thermal design, evolved into the Super Fast Reactor concept, using light water in an extremely low-density supercritical form to increase the neutron economy enough to allow breeding.

Aside from water-cooled, there are many other types of breeder reactor currently envisioned as possible. These include molten-salt cooled, gas cooled, and liquid-metal cooled designs in many variations. Almost any of these basic design types may be fueled by uranium, plutonium, many minor actinides, or thorium, and they may be designed for many different goals, such as creating more fissile fuel, long-term steady-state operation, or active burning of nuclear wastes.

Extant reactor designs are sometimes divided into two broad categories based upon their neutron spectrum, which generally separates those designed to use primarily uranium and transuranics from those designed to use thorium and avoid transuranics.  These designs are:

Fast breeder reactor (FBR) which uses fast (i.e. unmoderated) neutrons to breed fissile plutonium and possibly higher transuranics from fertile uranium-238. The fast spectrum is flexible enough that it can also breed fissile uranium-233 from thorium, if desired.
Thermal breeder reactor which uses thermal-spectrum (i.e. moderated) neutrons to breed fissile uranium-233 from thorium (thorium fuel cycle). Due to the behavior of the various nuclear fuels, a thermal breeder is thought commercially feasible only with thorium fuel, which avoids the buildup of the heavier transuranics.

Reprocessing 

Fission of the nuclear fuel in any reactor unavoidably produces neutron-absorbing fission products. One must reprocess the fertile material from a breeder reactor to remove those neutron poisons. This step is required to fully utilize the ability to breed as much or more fuel than is consumed. All reprocessing can present a proliferation concern, since it extracts weapons-usable material from spent fuel. The most common reprocessing technique, PUREX, presents a particular concern, since it was expressly designed to separate pure plutonium. Early proposals for the breeder-reactor fuel cycle posed an even greater proliferation concern because they would use PUREX to separate plutonium in a highly attractive isotopic form for use in nuclear weapons.

Several countries are developing reprocessing methods that do not separate the plutonium from the other actinides. For instance, the non-water-based pyrometallurgical electrowinning process, when used to reprocess fuel from an integral fast reactor, leaves large amounts of radioactive actinides in the reactor fuel. More conventional water-based reprocessing systems include SANEX, UNEX, DIAMEX, COEX, and TRUEX, and proposals to combine PUREX with co-processes.

All these systems have moderately better proliferation resistance than PUREX, though their adoption rate is low.

In the thorium cycle, thorium-232 breeds by converting first to protactinium-233, which then decays to uranium-233. If the protactinium remains in the reactor, small amounts of uranium-232 are also produced, which has the strong gamma emitter thallium-208 in its decay chain. Similar to uranium-fueled designs, the longer the fuel and fertile material remain in the reactor, the more of these undesirable elements build up. In the envisioned commercial thorium reactors, high levels of uranium-232 would be allowed to accumulate, leading to extremely high gamma-radiation doses from any uranium derived from thorium. These gamma rays complicate the safe handling of a weapon and the design of its electronics; this explains why uranium-233 has never been pursued for weapons beyond proof-of-concept demonstrations.

While the thorium cycle may be proliferation-resistant with regard to uranium-233 extraction from fuel (because of the presence of uranium-232), it poses a proliferation risk from an alternate route of uranium-233 extraction, which involves chemically extracting protactinium-233 and allowing it to decay to pure uranium-233 outside of the reactor. This process could happen beyond the oversight of organizations such as the International Atomic Energy Agency (IAEA).

Waste reduction 

Nuclear waste became a greater concern by the 1990s. Breeding fuel cycles attracted renewed interest because of their potential to reduce actinide wastes, particularly plutonium and minor actinides. Since breeder reactors on a closed fuel cycle would use nearly all of the actinides fed into them as fuel, their fuel requirements would be reduced by a factor of about 100. The volume of waste they generate would be reduced by a factor of about 100 as well. While there is a huge reduction in the volume of waste from a breeder reactor, the activity of the waste is about the same as that produced by a light-water reactor.

In addition, the waste from a breeder reactor has a different decay behavior, because it is made up of different materials. Breeder reactor waste is mostly fission products, while light-water reactor waste has a large quantity of transuranics. After spent nuclear fuel has been removed from a light-water reactor for longer than 100,000 years, these transuranics would be the main source of radioactivity. Eliminating them would eliminate much of the long-term radioactivity from the spent fuel.

In principle, breeder fuel cycles can recycle and consume all actinides, leaving only fission products. As the graphic in this section indicates, fission products have a peculiar 'gap' in their aggregate half-lives, such that no fission products have a half-life between 91 years and two hundred thousand years. As a result of this physical oddity, after several hundred years in storage, the activity of the radioactive waste from a Fast Breeder Reactor would quickly drop to the low level of the long-lived fission products. However, to obtain this benefit requires the highly efficient separation of transuranics from spent fuel. If the fuel reprocessing methods used leave a large fraction of the transuranics in the final waste stream, this advantage would be greatly reduced.

Both types of breeding cycles can reduce actinide wastes:
The fast breeder reactor's fast neutrons can fission actinide nuclei with even numbers of both protons and neutrons. Such nuclei usually lack the low-speed "thermal neutron" resonances of fissile fuels used in LWRs.
The thorium fuel cycle inherently produces lower levels of heavy actinides. The fertile material in the thorium fuel cycle has an atomic weight of 232, while the fertile material in the uranium fuel cycle has an atomic weight of 238. That mass difference means that thorium-232 requires six more neutron capture events per nucleus before the transuranic elements can be produced. In addition to this simple mass difference, the reactor gets two chances to fission the nuclei as the mass increases: First as the effective fuel nuclei U233, and as it absorbs two more neutrons, again as the fuel nuclei U235.

A reactor whose main purpose is to destroy actinides, rather than increasing fissile fuel-stocks, is sometimes known as a burner reactor. Both breeding and burning depend on good neutron economy, and many designs can do either. Breeding designs surround the core by a breeding blanket of fertile material. Waste burners surround the core with non-fertile wastes to be destroyed. Some designs add neutron reflectors or absorbers.

Breeder reactor concepts 

There are several concepts for breeder reactors; the two main ones are:
Reactors with a fast neutron spectrum are called fast breeder reactors (FBR) – these typically utilize uranium-238 as fuel.
Reactors with a thermal neutron spectrum are called thermal breeder reactors – these typically utilize thorium-232 as fuel.

Fast breeder reactor 

In 2006 all large-scale fast breeder reactor (FBR) power stations were liquid metal fast breeder reactors (LMFBR) cooled by liquid sodium. These have been of one of two designs:
Loop type, in which the primary coolant is circulated through primary heat exchangers outside the reactor tank (but inside the biological shield due to radioactive  in the primary coolant)

Pool type, in which the primary heat exchangers and pumps are immersed in the reactor tank

All current fast neutron reactor designs use liquid metal as the primary coolant, to transfer heat from the core to steam used to power the electricity generating turbines. FBRs have been built cooled by liquid metals other than sodium—some early FBRs used mercury, other experimental reactors have used a sodium-potassium alloy called NaK. Both have the advantage that they are liquids at room temperature, which is convenient for experimental rigs but less important for pilot or full-scale power stations. Lead and lead-bismuth alloy have also been used.

Three of the proposed generation IV reactor types are FBRs:
Gas-cooled fast reactor (GFR) cooled by helium.
Sodium-cooled fast reactor (SFR) based on the existing liquid-metal FBR (LMFBR) and integral fast reactor designs.
Lead-cooled fast reactor (LFR) based on Soviet naval propulsion units.

FBRs usually use a mixed oxide fuel core of up to 20% plutonium dioxide (PuO2) and at least 80% uranium dioxide (UO2). Another fuel option is metal alloys, typically a blend of uranium, plutonium, and zirconium (used because it is "transparent" to neutrons). Enriched uranium can also be used on its own.

Many designs surround the core in a blanket of tubes that contain non-fissile uranium-238, which, by capturing fast neutrons from the reaction in the core, converts to fissile plutonium-239 (as is some of the uranium in the core), which is then reprocessed and used as nuclear fuel. Other FBR designs rely on the geometry of the fuel itself (which also contains uranium-238), arranged to attain sufficient fast neutron capture. The plutonium-239 (or the fissile uranium-235) fission cross-section is much smaller in a fast spectrum than in a thermal spectrum, as is the ratio between the 239Pu/235U fission cross-section and the 238U absorption cross-section. This increases the concentration of 239Pu/235U needed to sustain a chain reaction, as well as the ratio of breeding to fission.
On the other hand, a fast reactor needs no moderator to slow down the neutrons at all, taking advantage of the fast neutrons producing a greater number of neutrons per fission than slow neutrons. For this reason ordinary liquid water, being a moderator and neutron absorber, is an undesirable primary coolant for fast reactors. Because large amounts of water in the core are required to cool the reactor, the yield of neutrons and therefore breeding of 239Pu are strongly affected. Theoretical work has been done on reduced moderation water reactors, which may have a sufficiently fast spectrum to provide a breeding ratio slightly over 1. This would likely result in an unacceptable power derating and high costs in a liquid-water-cooled reactor, but the supercritical water coolant of the supercritical water reactor (SCWR) has sufficient heat capacity to allow adequate cooling with less water, making a fast-spectrum water-cooled reactor a practical possibility.

The type of coolants, temperatures and fast neutron spectrum puts the fuel cladding material (normally austenitic stainless or ferritic-martensitic steels) under extreme conditions. The understanding of the radiation damage, coolant interactions, stresses and temperatures are necessary for the safe operation of any reactor core. All materials used to date in sodium-cooled fast reactors have known limits, as explored in ONR-RRR-088 review. Oxide Dispersion Strengthened (ODS) steel is viewed as the long-term radiation resistant fuel-cladding material that overcome the shortcomings of today's material choices.

There are only two commercially operating breeder reactors : the BN-600 reactor, at 560 MWe, and the BN-800 reactor, at 880 MWe. Both are Russian sodium-cooled reactors.

Integral fast reactor 

One design of fast neutron reactor, specifically conceived to address the waste disposal and plutonium issues, was the integral fast reactor (IFR, also known as an integral fast breeder reactor, although the original reactor was designed to not breed a net surplus of fissile material).

To solve the waste disposal problem, the IFR had an on-site electrowinning fuel-reprocessing unit that recycled the uranium and all the transuranics (not just plutonium) via electroplating, leaving just short half-life fission products in the waste. Some of these fission products could later be separated for industrial or medical uses and the rest sent to a waste repository. The IFR pyroprocessing system uses molten cadmium cathodes and electrorefiners to reprocess metallic fuel directly on-site at the reactor. Such systems not only co-mingle all the minor actinides with both uranium and plutonium, they are compact and self-contained, so that no plutonium-containing material needs to be transported away from the site of the breeder reactor. Breeder reactors incorporating such technology would most likely be designed with breeding ratios very close to 1.00, so that after an initial loading of enriched uranium and/or plutonium fuel, the reactor would then be refueled only with small deliveries of natural uranium metal. A quantity of natural uranium metal equivalent to a block about the size of a milk crate delivered once per month would be all the fuel such a 1 gigawatt reactor would need. Such self-contained breeders are currently envisioned as the final self-contained and self-supporting ultimate goal of nuclear reactor designers. The project was canceled in 1994 by United States Secretary of Energy Hazel O'Leary.

Other fast reactors 

Another proposed fast reactor is a fast molten salt reactor, in which the molten salt's moderating properties are insignificant. This is typically achieved by replacing the light metal fluorides (e.g. LiF, BeF2) in the salt carrier with heavier metal chlorides (e.g., KCl, RbCl, ZrCl4).

Several prototype FBRs have been built, ranging in electrical output from a few light bulbs' equivalent (EBR-I, 1951) to over 1,000 MWe. As of 2006, the technology is not economically competitive to thermal reactor technology, but India, Japan, China, South Korea and Russia are all committing substantial research funds to further development of fast breeder reactors, anticipating that rising uranium prices will change this in the long term. Germany, in contrast, abandoned the technology due to safety concerns. The SNR-300 fast breeder reactor was finished after 19 years despite cost overruns summing up to a total of 3.6 billion, only to then be abandoned.

India is also developing FBR technology using both uranium and thorium feedstocks.

Thermal breeder reactor 

The advanced heavy water reactor (AHWR) is one of the few proposed large-scale uses of thorium. India is developing this technology, motivated by substantial thorium reserves; almost a third of the world's thorium reserves are in India, which lacks significant uranium reserves.

The third and final core of the Shippingport Atomic Power Station 60 MWe reactor was a light water thorium breeder, which began operating in 1977. It used pellets made of thorium dioxide and uranium-233 oxide; initially, the U-233 content of the pellets was 5–6% in the seed region, 1.5–3% in the blanket region and none in the reflector region. It operated at 236 MWt, generating 60 MWe and ultimately produced over 2.1 billion kilowatt hours of electricity. After five years, the core was removed and found to contain nearly 1.4% more fissile material than when it was installed, demonstrating that breeding from thorium had occurred.

The liquid fluoride thorium reactor (LFTR) is also planned as a thorium thermal breeder. Liquid-fluoride reactors may have attractive features, such as inherent safety, no need to manufacture fuel rods and possibly simpler reprocessing of the liquid fuel. This concept was first investigated at the Oak Ridge National Laboratory Molten-Salt Reactor Experiment in the 1960s. From 2012 it became the subject of renewed interest worldwide. Japan, India, China, the UK, as well as private US, Czech and Australian companies have expressed intent to develop and commercialize the technology.

Discussion 

Like many aspects of nuclear power, fast breeder reactors have been subject to much controversy over the years. In 2010 the International Panel on Fissile Materials said "After six decades and the expenditure of the equivalent of tens of billions of dollars, the promise of breeder reactors remains largely unfulfilled and efforts to commercialize them have been steadily cut back in most countries". In Germany, the United Kingdom, and the United States, breeder reactor development programs have been abandoned. The rationale for pursuing breeder reactors—sometimes explicit and sometimes implicit—was based on the following key assumptions:
It was expected that uranium would be scarce and high-grade deposits would quickly become depleted if fission power were deployed on a large scale; the reality, however, is that since the end of the cold war, uranium has been much cheaper and more abundant than early designers expected.
It was expected that breeder reactors would quickly become economically competitive with the light-water reactors that dominate nuclear power today, but the reality is that capital costs are at least 25% more than water-cooled reactors.
It was thought that breeder reactors could be as safe and reliable as light-water reactors, but safety issues are cited as a concern with fast reactors that use a sodium coolant, where a leak could lead to a sodium fire.
It was expected that the proliferation risks posed by breeders and their "closed" fuel cycle, in which plutonium would be recycled, could be managed. But since plutonium-breeding reactors produce plutonium from U238, and thorium reactors produce fissile U233 from thorium, all breeding cycles could theoretically pose proliferation risks. However U232, which is always present in U233 produced in breeder reactors, is a strong gamma-emitter via its daughter products, and would make weapon handling extremely hazardous and the weapon easy to detect.

There are some past anti-nuclear advocates that have become pro-nuclear power as a clean source of electricity since breeder reactors effectively recycle most of their waste. This solves one of the most-important negative issues of nuclear power. In the documentary Pandora's Promise, a case is made for breeder reactors because they provide a real high-kW alternative to fossil fuel energy.  According to the movie, one pound of uranium provides as much energy as 5,000 barrels of oil.

FBRs have been built and operated in the United States, the United Kingdom, France, the former USSR, India and Japan. The experimental FBR SNR-300 was built in Germany but never operated and eventually shut down amid political controversy following the Chernobyl disaster. As of 2019, two FBRs are being operated for power generation in Russia. Several reactors are planned, many for research related to the Generation IV reactor initiative.

Development and notable breeder reactors 

The Soviet Union (comprising Russia and other countries, dissolved in 1991) constructed a series of fast reactors, the first being mercury-cooled and fueled with plutonium metal, and the later plants sodium-cooled and fueled with plutonium oxide.

BR-1 (1955) was 100W (thermal) was followed by BR-2 at 100 kW and then the 5MW BR-5.

BOR-60 (first criticality 1969) was 60 MW, with construction started in 1965.

BN-600 (1981), followed by Russia's BN-800 (2016)

Future plants 

India has been trying to develop fast breeder reactors for decades but suffered repeated delays. In 2012 an FBR called the Prototype Fast Breeder Reactor was due to be completed and commissioned. The program is intended to use fertile thorium-232 to breed fissile uranium-233. India is also pursuing thorium thermal breeder reactor technology. India's focus on thorium is due to the nation's large reserves, though known worldwide reserves of thorium are four times those of uranium. India's Department of Atomic Energy (DAE) said in 2007 that it would simultaneously construct four more breeder reactors of 500 MWe each including two at Kalpakkam.

BHAVINI, an Indian nuclear power company, was established in 2003 to construct, commission and operate all stage II fast breeder reactors outlined in India's three stage nuclear power programme.
To advance these plans, the Indian FBR-600 is a pool-type sodium-cooled reactor with a rating of 600 MWe.

The China Experimental Fast Reactor (CEFR) is a 25 MW(e) prototype for the planned China Prototype Fast Reactor (CFRP). It started generating power on 21 July 2011.

China also initiated a research and development project in thorium molten-salt thermal breeder-reactor technology (liquid fluoride thorium reactor), formally announced at the Chinese Academy of Sciences (CAS) annual conference in January 2011. Its ultimate target was to investigate and develop a thorium-based molten salt nuclear system over about 20 years.

Kirk Sorensen, former NASA scientist and chief nuclear technologist at Teledyne Brown Engineering, has long been a promoter of thorium fuel cycle and particularly liquid fluoride thorium reactors. In 2011, Sorensen founded Flibe Energy, a company aimed to develop 20–50 MW LFTR reactor designs to power military bases.

South Korea is developing a design for a standardized modular FBR for export, to complement the standardized PWR (pressurized water reactor) and CANDU designs they have already developed and built, but has not yet committed to building a prototype.

Russia has a plan for increasing its fleet of fast breeder reactors significantly. A BN-800 reactor (800 MWe) at Beloyarsk was completed in 2012, succeeding a smaller BN-600. In June 2014 the BN-800 was started in the minimum power mode. Working at 35% of nominal efficiency, the reactor contributed to the energy network on 10 December 2015. It reached its full power production in August 2016.

Plans for the construction of a larger BN-1200 reactor (1,200 MWe) was scheduled for completion in 2018, with two additional BN-1200 reactors built by the end of 2030. However, in 2015 Rosenergoatom postponed construction indefinitely to allow fuel design to be improved after more experience of operating the BN-800 reactor, and among cost concerns.

An experimental lead-cooled fast reactor, BREST-300 will be built at the Siberian Chemical Combine (SCC) in Seversk. The BREST design is seen as a successor to the BN series and the 300 MWe unit at the SCC could be the forerunner to a 1,200 MWe version for wide deployment as a commercial power generation unit. The development program is as part of an Advanced Nuclear Technologies Federal Program 2010–2020 that seeks to exploit fast reactors for uranium efficiency while 'burning' radioactive substances that would otherwise be disposed of as waste.
Its core would measure about 2.3 metres in diameter by 1.1 metres in height and contain 16 tonnes of fuel. The unit would be refuelled every year, with each fuel element spending five years in total within the core. Lead coolant temperature would be around 540 °C, giving a high efficiency of 43%, primary heat production of 700 MWt yielding electrical power of 300 MWe. The operational lifespan of the unit could be 60 years. The design is expected to be completed by NIKIET in 2014 for construction between 2016 and 2020.

On 16 February 2006, the United States, France and Japan signed an "arrangement" to research and develop sodium-cooled fast reactors in support of the Global Nuclear Energy Partnership.
In April 2007 the Japanese government selected Mitsubishi Heavy Industries (MHI) as the "core company in FBR development in Japan". Shortly thereafter, MHI started a new company, Mitsubishi FBR Systems (MFBR) to develop and eventually sell FBR technology.

In September 2010 the French government allocated 651.6 million to the Commissariat à l'énergie atomique to finalize the design of ASTRID (Advanced Sodium Technological Reactor for Industrial Demonstration), a 600 MW fourth-generation reactor design to be finalized in 2020.  the UK had shown interest in the PRISM reactor and was working in concert with France to develop ASTRID.  In 2019, CEA announced this design would not be built before mid-century.

In October 2010 GE Hitachi Nuclear Energy signed a memorandum of understanding with the operators of the US Department of Energy's Savannah River Site, which should allow the construction of a demonstration plant based on the company's S-PRISM fast breeder reactor prior to the design receiving full Nuclear Regulatory Commission (NRC) licensing approval. In October 2011 The Independent reported that the UK Nuclear Decommissioning Authority (NDA) and senior advisers within the Department for Energy and Climate Change (DECC) had asked for technical and financial details of PRISM, partly as a means of reducing the country's plutonium stockpile.

The traveling wave reactor (TWR) proposed in a patent by Intellectual Ventures is a fast breeder reactor designed to not need fuel reprocessing during the decades-long lifetime of the reactor. The breed-burn wave in the TWR design does not move from one end of the reactor to the other but gradually from the inside out. Moreover, as the fuel's composition changes through nuclear transmutation, fuel rods are continually reshuffled within the core to optimize the neutron flux and fuel usage at any given point in time. Thus, instead of letting the wave propagate through the fuel, the fuel itself is moved through a largely stationary burn wave. This is contrary to many media reports, which have popularized the concept as a candle-like reactor with a burn region that moves down a stick of fuel. By replacing a static core configuration with an actively managed "standing wave" or "soliton" core, TerraPower's design avoids the problem of cooling a highly variable burn region. Under this scenario, the reconfiguration of fuel rods is accomplished remotely by robotic devices; the containment vessel remains closed during the procedure, and there is no associated downtime.

See also 

India's three stage nuclear power programme
Fast neutron reactor
Sodium-cooled fast reactor
Integral Fast Reactor
Lead-cooled fast reactor
Gas-cooled fast reactor
Generation IV reactor
Reduced moderation water reactor
Supercritical water reactor
Nuclear fusion-fission hybrid
David Hahn

References

External links 
 – on OKBM Afrikantov official pdf
Breeder terminology
US Nuclear Program
IAEA Fast Reactors Database
IAEA Technical Documents on Fast Reactors
Reactors Designed by Argonne National Laboratory: Fast Reactor Technology Argonne pioneered the development of fast reactors and is a leader in the development of fast reactors worldwide. See also Argonne's Nuclear Science and Technology Legacy.
Atomic Heritage Foundation – EBR-I
The Changing Need for a Breeder Reactor by Richard Wilson at The Uranium Institute 24th Annual Symposium, September 1999
Experimental Breeder Reactor-II (EBR-II): An Integrated Experimental Fast Reactor Nuclear Power Station
International Thorium Energy Organisation – www.IThEO.org
lmfbr.com

Nuclear power reactor types